Vladimir Svechnikov is a former Soviet racewalking athlete who specialised in the 50 kilometres race walk. He competed at two editions of the IAAF World Race Walking Cup. At the 1973 IAAF World Race Walking Cup he placed tenth and on his return two years later at the 1975 race he took the bronze medal behind fellow Soviet Yevgeniy Lyungin and West Germany's Gerhard Weidner. At national level, he was overshadowed during his career by walkers such as Veniamin Soldatenko and Otto Barch.

International competitions

References

Living people
Year of birth missing (living people)
Soviet male racewalkers